The 2017 Empress's Cup was the 39th edition of the Japanese women's football national cup. NTV Beleza won its 11th title and sealed its first League-Cup double since the 2008 season after beating Nadeshiko Division 1 newcomer Nojima Stella in the final. Defending champion INAC Leonessa was defeated on penalties in the Round of 32 by the non-L. League team of the Waseda University.

References

Empress's Cup
Empress's Cup
Women's football competitions in Japan